Vermont Route 38 (VT 38) is a  long state highway located in Franklin County, Vermont, United States. The route, known locally as Lower Newton Street, begins at a junction with U.S. Route 7 in the city of St. Albans.  The route runs northwest into the town of St. Albans before ending at the entrance to the Northwest State Correctional Facility, where VT 38 transitions into Town Highway 6 heading westward.  One of the newest state highways in Vermont, VT 38 was designated in 1990.

Route description 

VT 38 begins at a field just west of the Northwest State Correctional Facility in the Franklin County town of St. Albans as a continuation of Lower Newton Street (Town Highway 6). Going west, TH 6 runs west to VT 36 while VT 38 runs east along Lower Newton along the northern edges of the prison, passing County Road and the entrance to the prison. Now running along the fields in St. Albans, passing a junction with Kellogg Road and turns southeast. VT 38 crosses over the former alignment of the Amtrak Montrealer, passing a local development in St. Albans, soon becoming a residential road as it enters the city of St. Albans. Now a main two-lane road, VT 38 past multiple residences, beginning a bend eastward at North Elm Street. After several blocks as a main west–east road, the route reaches a junction with U.S. Route 7 (North Main Street). This junction marks the eastern terminus of VT 38, which continues east on Upper Newton Street for two blocks through St. Albans.

History 
VT 38 was designated by the state of Vermont from the city of St. Albans to the Northwest State Correctional Facility in 1990.

Major intersections

References

External links 

038
Transportation in Franklin County, Vermont